Zarmihr Hazarwuxt was an Iranian military leader from the House of Karen, who served as the marzban of Sasanian Armenia briefly in 483.

Biography 
In 458, a Mamikonian princess, Sushanik, was murdered by her husband the Mihranid prince Varsken, who was a convert to Zoroastrianism. The reason for her murder was because she refused to convert and wanted to stay Christian. Varsken was then executed by Vakhtang I, king of Iberia. After hearing about the execution, Peroz I sent an army under commander Shapur Mihran to punish Vakhtang for intervening. However, Vakhtang was joined by the Armenians, and a revolt broke out in Persian Armenia, led by Vahan I Mamikonian.

Peroz I then sent another commander named Zarmihr Hazarwuxt, who laid siege to Dvin. Zarmihr, was however, defeated and only stayed in Persian Armenia during a short time until he set out to defeat the forces of Vakhtang I.

After hearing about the death of Peroz I during his war against the Hephthalites, Zarmihr left Iberia and returned to his son Sukhra in Ctesiphon, to protect the Sasanian Empire from the Hephthalites and to elect a new king. Balash, the brother of Peroz I, was crowned as the new king of the Sasanian Empire. However, it was in reality the son of Zarmihr, Sukhra who exercised real power over the Sasanian Empire. Zarmihr is thereafter no longer mentioned.

References

Sources 
 

 
 
 
 
 

 

5th-century births
5th-century deaths
Sasanian governors of Armenia
5th-century Iranian people
House of Karen
Generals of Peroz I
Generals of Balash